Țigănași is a commune in Iași County, Western Moldavia, Romania. It is composed of four villages: Cârniceni, Mihail Kogălniceanu, Stejarii and Țigănași.

Natives
Costache Antoniu

References

Communes in Iași County
Localities in Western Moldavia